Myelin and lymphocyte protein is a protein that in humans is encoded by the MAL gene.

Function 

The protein encoded by this gene is a highly hydrophobic integral membrane protein belonging to the MAL family of proteolipids. The protein has been localized to the endoplasmic reticulum of T-cells and is a candidate linker protein in T-cell signal transduction. In addition, this proteolipid is localized in compact myelin of cells in the nervous system and has been implicated in myelin biogenesis and/or function. The protein plays a role in the formation, stabilization and maintenance of glycosphingolipid-enriched membrane microdomains. Alternative splicing produces four transcript variants which vary from each other by the presence or absence of alternatively spliced exons 2 and 3. The MAL protein is also thought to interact with the protein encoded by LSMEM1 based on two-hybrid screening.

References

Further reading